V. Manikandan  is a leading cinematographer who works as the cinematographer for a number of major box office hits in Hindi, Tamil and Malayalam. He is an ad film cinematographer with more than 3000 ad films to his credit. 

He won the Best Cinematographer award Filmfare Awards South for the movie Anniyan. His debut movie was Atharmam (Tamil) in 1994. He has worked with directors Priyadarshan, Mani Ratnam and S. Shankar. In a function Mani Ratnam said "Yes - he is one of the good cinematographers in India". V. Manikandan was nominated for Asia Pacific Cine Awards(ASPA) for his work in Raavanan/Raavan in 2010 for Best Cinematography. He has won Apsara award for best cinematography for Raavan in 2011. He is the younger brother of Artist V. Jeevananthan, A National Awardee for his Book On Cinema 'Thiraicheelai' in the National film Awards 2010.

Filmography

Awards and nominations

Filmfare Awards
 2005 Won for Best Cinematography for the film Anniyan
 2007 Nominated for Best Cinematography for the film Om Shanti Om

Apsara Film & Television Producers Guild Awards
 2011 Won Best Cinematography Award for the film Raavan

International

Asia Pacific Cine Awards(ASPA)
 2010 Nominated for Best Cinematography for the film Raavanan

Annual Central European Bollywood Awards
 2012 Won Best Cinematography Award for the film Ra.One

External links 

1968 births
Living people
Indian Tamil people
Tamil film cinematographers
Malayalam film cinematographers
Filmfare Awards South winners
People from Coimbatore
21st-century Indian photographers
Cinematographers from Tamil Nadu